The Hopman Cup XXVI (also known as the Hyundai Hopman Cup for sponsorship reasons) corresponded to the 26th edition of the Hopman Cup tournament between nations in men's and women's tennis. The tournament commenced on 28 December 2013 at the Perth Arena in Perth, Western Australia.

Eight teams competed for the title, with two round robin groups of four, from which the top team of each group progress to the final.

Spain were the 2013 champions. In that tournament's final the Spain team of Anabel Medina Garrigues and Fernando Verdasco defeated Serbia's Ana Ivanovic and Novak Djokovic 2–1. This was Spain's fourth Hopman Cup title. They returned to defend their title, however, in 2014, Medina Garrigues was paired with Daniel Muñoz de la Nava—a replacement for the injured Tommy Robredo—and the nation failed to defend their title, finishing at the bottom of Group B.

On 17 July, France were the first team to confirm their entry into this year's edition; and were to be originally represented by Marion Bartoli and former Australian Open finalist Jo-Wilfried Tsonga; however, with Bartoli retiring in August, it was announced in October that Tsonga will instead pair with Alizé Cornet. After two previous runner-up showings, the nation won its first Hopman Cup title by defeating top seeds Poland in the final by two rubbers to one.

Tournament
The 2014 Hyundai Hopman Cup was an invitational tennis tournament and was also known as the Official Mixed Teams Championships of the ITF. The 2014 cup had prize money of $1 million and followed the traditional round robin format, the leading teams after three round robin matches qualify for the final. All matches were best of three sets with the exception of the doubles match where a match tie break, first to ten points, is played if the match is tied at one set all. All ties were played in this format; women's singles, men's singles and finally mixed doubles. In the event of a tie in the final group standings the following were used to separate the nations; 
 The highest total of matches won
 Best percentage of sets won and lost
 Best percentage of games won and lost
 Head-to-head performances
 Toss of a coin

Entrants

Seeds
The seeds for the 2014 Hopman Cup were decided by tournament director Steve Ayles, Paul Kilderry, Kim Hames and Terry Waldron.

Replacement players
 pre-tournament 

 in-tournament temporary replacements

Group stage

Group A
All times are local (UTC+8).

Standings

Poland vs. Italy

 The mixed doubles match was played with Australian junior Oliver Anderson playing for Seppi.

Canada vs. Australia

Poland vs. Canada

Italy vs. Australia

Italy vs. Canada

 The mixed doubles match was played with Australian Bojana Bobusic playing for Flavia Pennetta.

Poland vs. Australia

Group B
All times are local (UTC+8).

Standings

Czech Republic vs. Spain

United States vs. Spain

France vs. Czech Republic

United States vs. France

France vs. Spain

Czech Republic vs. United States

 The Men's Singles match was played with Canadian Milos Raonic playing for John Isner. 
The Mixed Doubles match was played with Australian's Bobusic & Anderson playing for Stephens & Isner.

Final

References

External links
 Official Site

Hopman Cup
Hopman Cups by year
Hopman Cup
Hopman Cup
Hopman Cup